Euleia is a genus of tephritid or fruit flies in the family Tephritidae. Cryptaciura is considered to be a synonym of Euleia.

List of species

 Euleia acrotoxa
 Euleia basihyalina
 Euleia contemnens
 Euleia esakii
 Euleia fratria (Loew, 1862)
 Euleia fucosa
 Euleia heraclei (Linnaeus, 1758)
 Euleia incerta
 Euleia inconspicua
 Euleia kovalevi (Korneyev, 1991)
 Euleia latipennis
 Euleia lucens
 Euleia marmorea (Fabricius, 1805)
 Euleia nemorivaga
 Euleia nigriceps
 Euleia odnosumi (Korneyev, 1991)
 Euleia rotundiventris (Fallen, 1814)
 Euleia scorpioides (Richter & Kandybina, 1981)
 Euleia separata (Becker, 1908)
 Euleia setibasis Hering, 1953
 Euleia uncinata (Coquillett, 1899)
 Euleia unifasciata (Blanc & Foote, 1961)

References

External links

 
Tephritidae genera